Fiona Crawford (born 21 February 1977 in Sydney) is a softball player from Australia, who won a bronze medal at the 2000 Summer Olympics and a silver medal at the 2004 Summer Olympics. She is married to "Jason Crawford" and together they share two children "Cooper Jack Crawford" and "Ashton Hanes Crawford". Crawford, then Fiona Hanes, completed her schooling at Gilroy College, Castle Hill.

In addition to training with the national team, Crawford works as a human resources manager. In 2004, she received a 2004 Australian Institute of Sport Vocational Achievement Award. In 2005, she received an award for Human Resources Manager of the Year from the Australian Hotels Association. Fiona is also commentating on the Olympic Softball Program in the 2020 Summer Olympics.

References

1977 births
Living people
Australian softball players
Olympic softball players of Australia
Softball players at the 2000 Summer Olympics
Softball players at the 2004 Summer Olympics
Olympic silver medalists for Australia
Olympic bronze medalists for Australia
Sportswomen from New South Wales
Olympic medalists in softball
Medalists at the 2004 Summer Olympics
Sportspeople from Sydney
Medalists at the 2000 Summer Olympics